Income Insurance Limited, commonly known as Income, is one of the leading composite insurers in Singapore, offering life, health and general insurance. Established in Singapore in 1970 to plug a social need for insurance, Income continues to serve the protection, savings and investment needs of individuals, families and businesses today to empower better financial well-being for all.

Formerly known as NTUC Income Insurance Co-operative Limited ("NTUC Income"), the company now operates as Income Insurance Limited, a public non-listed company limited by shares. This follows the successful transfer of the insurance business of the co-operative, NTUC Income Insurance Co-operative Limited ("NTUC Income") to Income Insurance Limited, as part of its corporatisation exercise from 1 September 2022.

Income has extended its footprint beyond Singapore intro the region and introduced new insurance business models including Insurance-as-a-Service, micro-insurance and investment, usage-based insurance, subscription-based insurance, to reimagine the way customers engage with insurance and its purchasing journey to gain protection. Its regional presence is powered by its Insurance-as-a-Service platform, HIVE by Income, through strategic and like-minded local partnerships with leading players in the insurance, broker and insurtech arenas. This is part of Income's journey to leverage technology and embed insurance and finance in people's lifestyle.

Currently, it has seven branches and lite branches respectively across Singapore, as well as operations in Indonesia, Malaysia, and Vietnam.

History
The idea of co-operatives, also known as social enterprises, was first conceived at the Modernisation Seminar in 1969, where delegates from NTUC affiliated unions gathered to discuss the challenges Singaporean workers were facing. Then, Singapore was a developing nation with a population comprising mostly blue-collar and low income workers.

One of the founding leaders of NTUC, Mr Devan Nair, articulated the need for the Labour Movement to turn into a social institution to serve Singaporean workers in various ways. 
Then Finance Minister Dr Goh Keng Swee supported this call and urged NTUC to set up social enterprises in areas such as life insurance and essential consumer goods to meet the needs of the working population.

This led to the establishment of NTUC co-operatives or Social Enterprises.

Income was established in 1970 with the objective of providing insurance protection to the masses. At that time, life insurance was something only the higher income group could afford.

Today, Income serves over two million customers. It is the top composite insurer in Singapore and one of the largest general insurers and health insurance providers. Income is also the largest motor insurer in Singapore, covering about one in four vehicles in Singapore. In addition, it has expanded to Indonesia, Malaysia and Vietnam in 2021 with partnerships in those countries, operating by an insurance-as-a-service model.

On 6 January 2022, plans were announced for Income to transit from a cooperative to a company called Income Insurance Ltd amid stiff competition in the insurance industry, with no changes to staff and existing policyholders' coverage. The corporatisation exercise was completed on 1 September 2022.

Building stronger communities

Special Care
In August 2013, Income became the first insurer in Singapore to provide insurance coverage specially designed for children with autism. The plan, called SpecialCare (Autism), provides coverage for medical expenses from accidents and infectious diseases. This includes outpatient and hospitalisation expenses, daily hospital income, personal liability, death and disability due to accidents. They include reimbursement for mobility aids, psychiatric treatment and physiotherapy, home modifications and caregiver training following an accident. Income expanded its insurance coverage for the special-needs community in December 2014, when it unveiled SpecialCare (Down Syndrome).

Income Family Micro-Insurance and Savings Scheme 
The Income Family Micro-Insurance and Savings Scheme (IFMISS), a free insurance scheme for low-income households with young children, was launched in April 2010. The Scheme covers eligible families with children registered at NTUC's My First Skool and families receiving financial assistance from the MOE Financial Assistance Scheme (MOE FAS) for Primary Schools.

In the unfortunate event of death or total and permanent disability (TPD) of a parent or guardian, IFMISS offers a pay-out of $5,000 to help the family cope financially during this difficult period, upon approval of the claim. Income also offers an additional pay-out (capped at $5,000) that matches the collective bank balances of the parent/guardian and his/her family unit.

Future Development Programme
The Income OrangeAid Future Development Programme (FDP) continues to be out flagship initiative that champions education in youth-in-need. The FDP supports low-income students studying at the Institute of Technical Education (ITE) and polytechnics in Singapore with bursaries, financial literacy training, as well as personal and career guidance.

With our belief that education empowers social mobility, the programme is designed to support our beneficiaries who are in difficult financial and family circumstances so that they stay focused and motivated to complete their tertiary education.

References

Financial services companies established in 1970
Insurance companies of Singapore
Singaporean brands
Singaporean companies established in 1970